The 12th Thailand National Games (Thai: กีฬาเขตแห่งประเทศไทย ครั้งที่ 12, also known as the 1978 National Games and the 1978 Interprovincial Games) were held in Ubon Ratchathani, Thailand from 24 to 30 January 1979, with competitions in 14 sports and athletes from 10 regions. These games were the qualifications for Thai athletes for the 1978 Asian Games.

The 1978 games were postponed by the Udon Thani floods until January 1979.

Emblem
The emblem of 1978 Thailand National Games was a purple circle, with the emblem of Sports Authority of Thailand on the inside, and surrounded by the text

Participating regions
The 11th Thailand National Games represented 10 regions from 72 provinces. Phayao, formerly part of Chiang Rai, made their debut.

Sports

 Athletics
 Badminton
 Basketball
 Boxing
 Cycling
 Football
 Judo
 Lawn tennis
 Sepaktakraw
 Shooting
 Swimming
 Table tennis
 Volleyball
 Weightlifting

References

External links
 Sports Authority of Thailand (SAT)

National Games
Thailand National Games
National Games
Thailand National Games
National Games